League tables for teams participating in Ykkönen, the second tier of the Finnish Soccer League system, in 2009.

League table

Promotion play-offs
JJK as 13th placed team of 2009 Veikkausliiga and KPV as runners-up of the 2009 Ykkönen competed in a two-legged play-offs for one spot in the 2010 Veikkausliiga. JJK won the play-offs by 5–3 and remained in Veikkausliiga.

References

Sources
Finnish FA (Suomen Palloliitto - Ykkönen 2009)

Ykkönen seasons
2009 in Finnish football leagues
Fin
Fin